Jürgen Mier (born 13 May 1941) is a German former sailor. He competed in the Finn event at the 1968 Summer Olympics.

References

External links
 

1941 births
Living people
German male sailors (sport)
Olympic sailors of East Germany
Sailors at the 1968 Summer Olympics – Finn
People from Greifswald
Sportspeople from Mecklenburg-Western Pomerania